Christian Gérard Mazas (4 October 1903 – 27 July 1984), known as Christian-Gérard, was a French stage and film actor as well as theater director.

Theatre

Comedian 
 1932 :  by Jacques Deval, directed by Jacques Baumer, Théâtre Saint-Georges
 1934 : Les Temps difficiles by Édouard Bourdet, Théâtre de la Michodière
 1934 :  by Sacha Guitry, directed by the author, théâtre de la Madeleine
 1935 : Les Joies du Capitole operette by Jacques Bousquet, Albert Willemetz, music Raoul Moretti, théâtre de la Madeleine 
 1936 : Christian by Yvan Noé, Théâtre des Variétés
 1937 : Bureau central des idées by Alfred Gehri, directed by Louis Tunc, théâtre de la Michodière
 1946 : Charivari Courteline after Georges Courteline, directed by Jean Mercure, théâtre des Ambassadeurs
 1948 : La Ligne de chance by Albert Husson, directed by Michèle Verly, théâtre Gramont

Theater director 

 1946 : César by Marcel Pagnol, théâtre des Variétés 
 1947 : Mort ou vif by Max Régnier, Théâtre de l'Étoile
 1950 : Jeff by Raoul Praxy, Théâtre de l'Ambigu-Comique
 1950 : Mon bébé by Maurice Hennequin after Baby mine by Margaret Mayo, théâtre de la Porte-Saint-Martin
 1950 : Les Héritiers Bouchard by Max Régnier, théâtre de la Porte-Saint-Martin
 1950 :  by Jean Bernard-Luc, Théâtre Montparnasse
 1951 : Cucendron ou la pure Agathe by Robert Favart, Théâtre Saint-Georges
 1951 : Le Congrès de Clermont-Ferrand by Marcel Franck,   
 1952 : La Cuisine des anges by Albert Husson, théâtre du Vieux-Colombier
 1952 : Back Street by Michel Dulud, 
 1952 : La Duchesse d'Algues by Peter Blackmore,   
 1952 : Zoé by Jean Marsan, Comédie-Wagram 
 1952 : On ne voit pas les cœurs by André Chamson, Théâtre Charles-de-Rochefort
 1953 : Les Pavés du ciel by Albert Husson, Théâtre des Célestins
 1954 : Carlos et Marguerite by Jean Bernard-Luc, Théâtre de la Madeleine 
 1954 : Le Coin tranquille by Michel André, Théâtre Michel
 1955 : José by Michel Duran, Théâtre des Nouveautés
 1955 : La Grande Felia by Jean-Pierre Conty, théâtre de l'Ambigu comique
 1955 :  by Albert Husson, théâtre Édouard VII then théâtre des Célestins
 1956 : Les Trois Messieurs de Bois-Guillaume by Louis Verneuil, théâtre des Célestins
 1956 : La Nuit du 4 août by Albert Husson, théâtre Édouard VII
 1956 : Ce soir je dîne chez moi by Clare Kummer, Comédie-Wagram
 1957 : Trois Souris aveugles by Agatha Christie, Théâtre de la Renaissance
 1958 : Les Parisiens by Irène Strozzi and Jean Parédès, Théâtre de l'Œuvre
 1958 : Virginie by Michel André, Théâtre Michel
 1958 : Les portes claquent by Michel Fermaud, théâtre Daunou
 1959 : Trésor Party by Bernard Régnier after a novel by P.G. Wodehouse, Théâtre La Bruyère
 1960 : Boeing Boeing by Marc Camoletti, Comédie-Caumartin
 1961 : Niki-Nikou by Jacques Bernard, théâtre de la Potinière
 1962 : Gentlemen Prefer Blondes by Anita Loos, théâtre des Arts  
 1963 :  by Jean Bernard-Luc, Comédie des Champs-Élysées
 1963 : Des enfants de cœur by François Campaux, 
 1964 : Des enfants de cœur by François Campaux, théâtre de l'Ambigu comique
 1964 :  by Gaby Bruyère, théâtre de la Potinière 
 1965 : Jamais trop tard by Arthur Long Summer, théâtre des Arts
 1965 : Des enfants de cœur by François Campaux, théâtre des Arts
 1966 : Baby Hamilton by Maurice Braddell and Anita Hart, théâtre de la Porte-Saint-Martin
 1966 : La Bonne Adresse by Marc Camoletti, théâtre des Nouveautés
 1967 : L'erreur est juste by Jean Paxet, théâtre des Arts
 1968 : Des enfants de cœur by François Campaux, théâtre Édouard VII

Filmography 

Actor
 1922 : La Femme de nulle part by Louis Delluc (unsure)
 1927 : L'Occident by Henri Fescourt
 1928 : L'Âme de pierre by Gaston Roudès
 1928 : Les Nouveaux Messieurs by Jacques Feyder
 1928 : La Princesse Mandane by Germaine Dulac
 1928 : La Symphonie pathétique by Henri Etievant and Mario Nalpas
 1932 : Le Fils improvisé by René Guissart
 1932 :  by Robert Wyler et Yves Mirande
 1932 : L'Aimable Lingère, short by Émile-Bernard Donatien 
 1933 :  by René Guissart : Lahoche
 1933 : Charlemagne by Pierre Colombier : Bardac
 1933 : L'Épervier by Marcel L'Herbier
 1934 : Jeanne (1934 film) by Georges Marret
 1934 : Maître Bolbec et son mari by Jacques Natanson : Valentin
 1935 : Dora Nelson by René Guissart  : Raoul d'Aubigny
 1935 : Valse royale by Jean Grémillon : Pilou
 1936 :  by Raymond Bernard : l'amoureux
 1936 : Le cœur dispose by Georges Lacombe
 1936 :  by Sacha Guitry and Alexandre Ryder : Fernand Worms
 1936 : La Vie parisienne by Robert Siodmak : Georges
 1936 :  by Jean Choux : Coco
 1936 : Samson by Maurice Tourneur : Max d'Audeline
 1936 : Mon cousin de Marseille short by Germain Fried 
 1937 : Le Petit Bateau short by Pierre Ramelot 
 1938 :  by Jean de Limur
 1939 :  by Jean Choux : Xavier Lahurque
 1939 :  by René Pujol : Guy Leroy
 1940 :  by Jean Choux
 1941 :  by Jean Boyer : Paul Bardot
 1942 :  by Jean Boyer : Arsène
 1942 : Frederica by Jean Boyer : a friend of Gilbert
 1942 :  by Christian Chamborant : Léon Tourlet
 1943 : Le Colonel Chabert by René Le Hénaff
 1948 :  by Jean Tedesco

Television 
Theater director
 , TV director Pierre Sabbagh, théâtre Marigny 
 1966 : Virginie by Michel André
 1966 : La Cuisine des anges by Albert Husson
 1966 :  by Michel Fermaud
 1967 : José by Michel Duran
 1967 :  by 
 1969 : Ombre chère by Jacques Deval
 1970 : Je l'aimais trop by Jean Guitton

Notes

External links 
 
 
 Les Archives du spectacle

Theatre directors from Paris
Male actors from Paris
1903 births
1984 deaths